Ladopyris is a genus of wood midges in the family Cecidomyiidae. The one described species - Ladopyris baltica - is known from Sweden and Estonia. The genus was established by Mathias Jaschhof and Catrin Jaschhof in 2020.

References

Cecidomyiidae genera

Taxa named by Mathias Jaschhof
Insects described in 2020
Monotypic Diptera genera
Taxa named by Catrin Jaschhof
Diptera of Europe